Where Are the Boys? is the second studio album by New Zealand band Th' Dudes, released in 1980. The band had already broken up by the time the record was released.

Track listing

References

Th' Dudes albums
1980 albums